HAT-P-11b (or Kepler-3b) is an extrasolar planet orbiting the star HAT-P-11. It was discovered by the HATNet Project team in 2009 using the transit method, and submitted for publication on 2 January 2009.

This planet is located approximately  distant from Earth.

Discovery
The HATNet Project team initially detected the transits of HAT-P-11b from analysis of 11470 images, taken in 2004 and 2005, by the HAT-6 and HAT-9 telescopes. The planet was confirmed using 50 radial velocity measurements taken with the HIRES radial velocity spectrometer at W. M. Keck Observatory.

At the time of its discovery HAT-P-11b was the smallest radius transiting extrasolar planet discovered by a ground based transit search and was also one of three previously known transiting planets within the initial field of view of the Kepler spacecraft.

There was a linear trend in the radial velocities indicating the possibility of another planet in the system. This planet, HAT-P-11c, was confirmed in 2018.

Characteristics
This planet orbits about the same distance from the star as 51 Pegasi b is from 51 Pegasi, typical of transiting planets. However, the orbit of this planet is eccentric, at around 0.198, unusually high for hot Neptunes. HAT-P-11b's orbit is also highly inclined, with a tilt of 103°. degrees relative to its star's rotation. The planet is probably composed primarily of heavy elements with only 10% hydrogen and helium by mass, like Gliese 436 b.

On 24 September 2014, NASA reported that HAT-P-11b is the first Neptune-sized exoplanet known to have a relatively cloud-free atmosphere and, as well, the first time molecules, namely water vapor, of any kind have been found on such a relatively small exoplanet.

In 2009 French astronomers observed what was thought to be a weak unpolarized radio signal coming from the exoplanet, but it was not observed in a repeat observation in 2010. If the signal was real, then it was probably due to intense lightning storms with similar properties as ones on Saturn. 

In December 2021 a magnetosphere was discovered in HAT-P-11b, the first ever in any exoplanet.

See also
 Gliese 436 b
 HATNet Project
 HAT-P-7b
 Kepler Mission

References

External links

 

Exoplanets discovered by HATNet
Exoplanets discovered in 2009
Giant planets
Transiting exoplanets
Cygnus (constellation)
Hot Neptunes